These are the results of the men's 65 kg (also known as half-lightweight) competition in judo at the 1996 Summer Olympics in Atlanta, Georgia.  A total of 35 men competed in this event, limited to jūdōka whose body weight was less than, or equal to, 65 kilograms.  Competition took place in the Georgia World Congress Center.

Tournament results

First round
As there were more than 32 qualifiers for the tournament, three first round matches were held to reduce the field to 32 judoka.
  defeated 
  defeated 
  defeated

Main bracket
The gold and silver medalists were determined by the final match of the main single-elimination bracket.

Repechage
The losing semifinalists as well as those judoka eliminated in earlier rounds by the four semifinalists of the main bracket advanced to the repechage.  These matches determined the two bronze medalists for the event.

References

External links
 
 Official Olympic report

M65
Judo at the Summer Olympics Men's Half Lightweight
Men's events at the 1996 Summer Olympics